Lofa-4 is an electoral district for the elections to the House of Representatives of Liberia. The constituency covers Voinjama City, Quardu Gboni District, six communities of Voinjama District (Worbalamai, Kesselemai, Vezala, Dayzabah, Zogolemai, Karzah) and two communities of Zorzor District (Barziwen, Konia).

Elected representatives

References

Electoral districts in Liberia